The EuroLeague Final Four Most Valuable Player Award is presented and awarded to the basketball player who has exhibited the most exceptional play during the EuroLeague Final Four. The award often goes to the best player on the European-wide top-tier level EuroLeague's best team. It is generally considered to be the most prestigious individual award in European professional club basketball.

The Final Four MVP award was first given at the end of the 1987–88 season, when the competition that would later become called EuroLeague, was then known as the FIBA European Champions Cup. Prior to the 1987–88 season, the Top Scorer of the EuroLeague Finals was noted. However, an actual MVP was not named until the first EuroLeague Final Four of the modern era was held.

EuroLeague Finals Top Scorers (1958–1987)
From the 1958 to 1986–87 seasons, the Top Scorer of the EuroLeague Finals was noted, regardless of whether he played on the winning or losing team. However, there was no actual MVP award given.

Voting criteria
From the 1988 EuroLeague Final Four through the 2016 EuroLeague Final Four, the voting for the EuroLeague Final Four MVP was done by the accredited media members in attendance. Starting with the 2017 EuroLeague Final Four, the voting for the award includes an online vote of fans as well.

All-time EuroLeague Final Four MVP award winners (1988–present)

Since the end of the 1987–88 season, when the first EuroLeague Final Four (1988 EuroLeague Final Four) was held, an MVP is named at the conclusion of each Final Four.

Notes:
 There was no awarding in the 2019–20, because the season was cancelled due to the coronavirus pandemic in Europe.

† The 2000–01 season was a transition year, with the best European teams splitting into two different major leagues: The SuproLeague, held by FIBA, and the EuroLeague, held by Euroleague Basketball. That season's EuroLeague Basketball tournament did not end with a Final Four tournament. Instead, it ended with a 5-game playoff series. So, Manu Ginóbili was named the EuroLeague Finals MVP that season.

Multiple honors

Players

NB:
 Kukoč won his first two awards in 1990 and 1991, as a citizen of SFR Yugoslavia; Croatia declared its independence on June 25, 1991, after that year's Champions Cup finals.
 Bodiroga won his first award in 2002, as a citizen of FR Yugoslavia. The country changed its name to Serbia and Montenegro in February 2003, three months before he won his second award; upon the dissolution of the latter state in 2006, he became a citizen of Serbia.

Player nationality

NB: 
 Players from the former Yugoslavia are classified by their nationality in one of the current post-Yugoslav states.
 Rice won his award in 2014, as a citizen of both the United States and Montenegro.
 Players from FR Yugoslavia classify as players from Serbia.

Teams

See also 
 EuroLeague Awards
 EuroLeague Final Four
 EuroLeague All-Final Four Team
 EuroLeague Basketball 2001–10 All-Decade Team
 EuroLeague Season MVP
 Euroscar
 FIBA Europe Player of the Year Award
 FIBA Europe Young Men's Player of the Year Award
 50 Greatest EuroLeague Contributors (2008)
 Mr. Europa

References

External links
 EuroLeague official webpage
 InterBasket EuroLeague Basketball Forum
 TalkBasket EuroLeague Basketball Forum
 

Final Four MVP
Basketball most valuable player awards